This reference source has been created to collate UK resilience abbreviations into a single location.  UK resilience is the equivalent of the EU civil protection and other countries' emergency management programmes.

External links
 Civil Contingencies Secretariat Lexicon

Emergency management in the United Kingdom
Lists of United Kingdom abbreviations